The Cordillera Central is a Bolivian mountain range that divides the three river basins in the country and also has the second highest peaks in Bolivia. It is rich in minerals and starts in the north with Chawpi Urqu and the three Palumanis that were in the south up to Zapaleri, forming a border with Chile and Argentina. The Cordillera Central is divided into three sections:

 The northern section or Cordillera Real, with Chawpi Urqu and Palumani, also taking into account the most significant of Bolivia that you find near La Paz, Illimani, Illampu, Janq'u Uma, Mururata, and Huayna Potosí, all of which are more than 6,000 meters high. This section is famous because the highest meteorological observatory in the world can be found on Chacaltaya. Some of the highest ski slopes in the world can be found here also.
 The central section contains Sumaq Urqu, with the Potosí mountain range and the Paso de Condor rail station, both  situated at an elevation of 4,288 meters.
 The southern section is characterized by its high rate of mineralization and large deposits of tin. Its highest summit is Zapaleri on the border with Chile and Argentina.
Cordillera Central can also be found between Cordillera Occidental and Cordillera Oriental

See also
 Cordillera Occidental (Bolivia)
 Cordillera Oriental (Bolivia)
 Cordillera Central (disambiguation)

Mountain ranges of Bolivia